Street Angel is the fifth studio album by American singer and songwriter Stevie Nicks. Released in 1994, the album peaked at No. 45 on the Billboard 200 albums chart and has been certified Gold by the RIAA for shipments of over 500,000 copies.

History
The album was released in 1994 during a particularly unhappy time in Nicks' life and career. It was the first album she released after her much publicized departure from Fleetwood Mac and during the tail end of her seven-year-long dependency on the prescription medication Klonopin. It is the least successful record of her solo career, peaking at only No. 45 in the U.S. with first week sales of 38,000, and spent only three weeks within the top 100. However, the album has achieved Gold status there for shipping 500,000 copies.

Unlike all of her previous releases, the album did not yield any major hit singles, though "Maybe Love Will Change Your Mind" reached No. 57 on the Billboard Hot 100.  A second single, "Blue Denim", reached No. 70 in Canada.

The album enjoyed slightly more prominence in the UK, where it peaked at No. 16. "Blue Denim" was originally lined up as the lead-release in the UK, and promotional copies were circulated to radio stations in April 1994, but it was replaced at the last moment by  "Maybe Love Will Change Your Mind", which peaked at No. 42. The UK release of the "Maybe Love..." single featured two separate CD-single releases as an attempt to boost the song's chance of UK chart success (no promotional video was shot for the single, unlike "Blue Denim"), and included a newly recorded version of "Thousand Days" (originally demo-ed for her third solo album, Rock A Little).

Nicks was not happy with production work done by Glyn Johns on the sessions and spoke about the issues in an interview with Joe Benson: "And I didn't fix it while I was working with the person that I was working with (Johns)... who doesn't like to be talked about because he's not speaking to me, um... I didn't like it when he was there, and he knew it, and basically he told me to... like, in no uncertain English, very rough terms, to shut up and deal with it and this was the way it was going to be."

"This is not my record. So I went back in for about eight weeks and I didn't mess with the vocals, which I should have. But I was so sort of overwhelmed with trying to fix the things that I didn't like about the music, which was like... there was no percussion, there was no Waddy Wachtel. Because I was told that the last thing that I would need was Waddy Wachtel. And I, you know... I mean, to that comment I was so speechless that I just didn't do anything, I said ok. So when I went back in, I had Waddy come in and play, and I had Peter Michael come in and put percussion on, and Michael Campbell came back and put some more guitar on it, and we re-mixed everything, and we did a lot of other things besides that."

"I should have gone back in and really worked with the album, with the vocals. Because that's something that... I guess that was the last thing that I knew was wrong with it, and after being in two months trying to fix everything that I thought was wrong about the music and the mixes, it was almost kind of like, you know, maybe you just need to let this go and go on. I mean, this is three years now. And this record should have been out a long time ago. It may be new for everybody else, but it's really old for me."

Regarding the song Blue Denim, Nicks stated, "Well, I wrote this... um, it's a song about this guy who came into my life, but left just as quick. And his eyes were that intense, that it just makes you, even if you didn't know him, you would go, like, 'wow.' And you could be, like, the toughest person, but those eyes would make you be whatever he wanted you to be." Nicks later said in the video commentary of this song that the song was written about former lover Lindsey Buckingham.

The album suffered further as Nicks spent her second stint in drug rehabilitation (for Klonopin dependency) during the mixing and mastering period. The record label rushed the production so Nicks would be ready to promote the album once out of rehab, but this meant that she had no input into the overall sound or track listing of the album - these duties were overseen by co-producer Thom Panunzio, who had previously worked with Nicks' close friend Tom Petty. On coming out of rehab, Nicks returned to the studio (without Johns) to overdub and re-record a lot of what had already been done. Despite her efforts, the album did not turn out how she wanted. She was, however, able to present some of the album's tracks ("Street Angel", "Destiny", "Rose Garden" and "Blue Denim") in her own final mixes on the 3-disc Enchanted retrospective in 1998.

Track listing

Due to her continued dependency on Klonopin, Nicks was particularly uninspired during the albums creation, which led to recording scrapped songs from previous years, or recording songs she did not write, which was uncommon for Nicks. "Greta", "Destiny", "Love is Like A River", and "Rose Garden" date back years prior to 1984, with "Rose Garden" being written in the early 70's. "Jane" and "Listen to The Rain" were written in 1990. "Docklands" was originally released by the group Mint Juleps in 1987. Nicks recorded two songs written by Ethan Johns, at the insistence of the original producer, Glyn Johns, who was the father of Ethan. Both songs were removed from the standard album and used as B-sides. Other songs were written by frequent collaborators Sandy Stewart & Rick Nowels.

Originally, the track "If You Were My Love", which Nicks had demo-ed for her 1981 debut album Bella Donna and for Fleetwood Mac’s 1982 album Mirage, was slated to appear on this album. However, Nicks decided to remove it during the remastering with Panunzio. "If You Were My Love" was released on Nicks’s 2014 album 24 Karat Gold: Songs from the Vault.

Additionally, the song "I Call You Missing", which had been demo-ed for 1985's Rock a Little, was tried out for this album, but did not surface. "I Call You Missing" remains unreleased.

B-sides
 "Mirror, Mirror" – B-side to "Blue Denim" cassette single. Originally recorded for the Rock A Little album in 1984 and later surfaced during sessions for The Other Side of the Mirror in 1989 but was not included. Nicks later revealed that "Mirror, Mirror" was the original intended title for both albums. The version released as a B-side was recorded in 1984, but it was later revealed that a 1992 recording of the song was originally intended as the b-side and that the 1984 recording was added in error.
 "Thousand Days" – B-side to the European CD single for "Blue Denim" and UK single for "Maybe Love Will Change Your Mind". Later appeared on disc 3 of the Enchanted box set. The song was originally written for the Rock a Little album, and demos were recorded, but the song was scrapped.
 "Inspiration" - B-side to "Maybe Love". A song cut from the final album but included on the Japanese release as a bonus track.

Personnel 
 Stevie Nicks – lead vocals
 Benmont Tench – organ (1, 3-6, 8-13), synthesizers (1, 3-6, 8-13)
 Cat Gray – synthesizers (3, 12)
 Roy Bittan – acoustic piano (6, 7)
 Mike Campbell – guitars (1, 2, 11, 12)
 Bernie Leadon – guitars (1-4, 6, 8, 9, 11, 12)
 Andy Fairweather Low – guitars (1, 3-9, 11, 12)
 Waddy Wachtel – guitars (1-5, 7-13)
 Tim Pierce – guitars (7, 10, 13)
 Bob Dylan – guitar (11), harmonica (11)
 Pat Donaldson – bass (1-6, 11)
 John Pierce – bass (7, 10, 12)
 David Randi – bass (8)
 Ron Blair – bass (9)
 Ethan Johns – drums (1, 8, 9, 12), percussion (12), electric slide guitar (8, 9, 12)
 Kenny Aronoff – drums (2, 5, 7, 10, 11, 13)
 Peter Michael – percussion (1-5, 7-13), drums (6)
 Glyn Johns – percussion programming (3, 4)
 Joel Derouin – electric violin (2, 3, 5), synthesizers (13)
 Christopher Nicks – harmonica (2)
 Dave Koz – saxophone (7)
 David Crosby – harmony vocals (3)
 Sharon Celani – backing vocals (4-8, 10-13)
 Sara Fleetwood – backing vocals (4-8, 10-13)
 Lori Nicks – backing vocals (4-8, 11, 12, 13

Production 
 Glen Parrish – executive producer 
 Stevie Nicks – producer 
 Thom Panunzio – producer, recording (10, 13), mixing 
 Roy Bittan – producer (10, 13)
 John Aguto – engineer 
 Brian Scheuble – engineer, mixing
 Paul Dieter – recording (10, 13)
 Kevin Killen – recording (10, 13)
 Mike Baumgartner – assistant engineer 
 Jim Champagne – assistant engineer 
 Dave Hecht – assistant engineer 
 Ed Korengo – assistant engineer 
 Rail Rogut – assistant engineer 
 Michael C. Ross – assistant engineer 
 Eric Rudd – assistant engineer 
 Eddy Schreyer – mastering 
 C.A. Nicks – art direction, design, layout 
 Paul Cox – photography 

Studios
 Recorded at Ocean Way Recording and A&M Studios (Hollywood, California); Groove Masters (Santa Monica, California).
 Mastered at Future Disc (Hollywood, California).

Promotion and tour
Nicks made an  appearance on the Tonight Show with Jay Leno on August 24, 1994, performing "Blue Denim" and sat down for an interview with Leno. She also performed the song on The Late Show with David Letterman and sat down for an interview in which she discussed the Bill Clinton inauguration.

Nicks toured in support of the album across the US during 1994. Although praised for her post-klonopin vocals, she was criticised for her weight gain and once the tour was over, vowed never to walk on stage again until she had reached a more reasonable weight.

Set list
"Outside the Rain"
"Dreams"
"Docklands" (replaced with "Rooms on Fire" later in the tour)
"No Spoken Word" (dropped early in the tour)
"Maybe Love Will Change Your Mind"
"Rhiannon"
"Stand Back"
"Destiny"
"Gold Dust Woman"
"Talk to Me"
"Blue Denim"
"How Still My Love" (dropped early in the tour)
"Edge of Seventeen"

Encore
"The Chain" (played at the House of Blues shows with ex-Fleetwood Mac member Rick Vito)
"I Need to Know"
"Has Anyone Ever Written Anything for You"

Tour dates'''
July 14, 1994  The Roxbury, Los Angeles, California
July 22, 1994 	Great Woods, Mansfield, Massachusetts
July 24, 1994 	Jones Beach Amphitheatre, Wantagh, New York
July 26, 1994 	Saratoga Performing Arts Center, Saratoga, New York
July 27, 1994 	Finger Lakes Performing Arts Center, Canandaigua, New York
July 29, 1994 	Starlake Amphitheatre, Burgettstown, Pennsylvania
July 30, 1994 	Mann Music Centre, Philadelphia, Pennsylvania
August 1, 1994 Garden State Arts Center, Holmdel, New Jersey
August 2, 1994 Ed Sullivan Theater, New York, New York
August 4, 1994 Walnut Creek Amphitheatre, Raleigh, North Carolina
August 5, 1994 Merriweather Post Pavilion, Columbia, Maryland
August 6, 1994 Classic Amphitheatre, Richmond, Virginia
August 8, 1994 Chastain Park Amphitheatre, Atlanta, Georgia
August 10, 1994 Blossom Music Center, Cuyahoga Falls, Ohio
August 13, 1994 Milwaukee State Fairgrounds, Milwaukee, Wisconsin
August 14, 1994 Poplar Creek Music Theatre, Poplar Creek, Illinois
August 16, 1994 Riverport Amphitheatre, Maryland Heights, Missouri
August 17, 1994 Sandstone Amphitheatre, Bonner Springs, Kansas
August 19, 1994 Pine Knob Amphitheatre, Clarkston, Michigan
August 20, 1994 Celeste Center, Columbus, Ohio
August 25, 1994 Greek Theatre, Los Angeles, California
August 26, 1994 Greek Theatre, Los Angeles, California
August 28, 1994 Concord Pavilion, Concord, California
August 29, 1994 Arco Arena, Sacramento, California
August 31, 1994 Irvine Meadows, Irvine, California
September. 2, 1994 	Shoreline Amphitheatre, Mountainview, California
September. 3, 1994 	Compton Terrace, Phoenix, Arizona
September. 5, 1994 	Aladdin Theatre, Las Vegas, Nevada
September. 7, 1994 	Fiddler's Green Amphitheatre, Denver, Colorado
September. 9, 1994 	Woods Pavilion, Houston, Texas
September. 10, 1994 Starplex Amphitheatre, Dallas, Texas
September. 17, 1994 House of Blues, Hollywood, California
September. 18, 1994 House of Blues, Hollywood, California

Notes
The final night at the House of Blues, Hollywood was recorded for a radio broadcast.
"Has Anyone Ever Written Anything for You" included a dedication.  The song including the dedication were omitted from the CD and Westwood One Radio claims they no longer have the original master recording.

Charts

Certifications

References

1994 albums
Stevie Nicks albums
Albums produced by Thom Panunzio
Modern Records (1980) albums
Atlantic Records albums
EMI Records albums